Live at The Triple Door is a live album recorded and released by The Courage in 2008 when they were still known as "Noah Gundersen & the Courage." The set was performed at the venue and lounge The Triple Door in Seattle, Washington.

Track listing
 "Poor Man's Son" – 5:37
 "America" – 4:52
 "Nine Pound Hammer" – 4:19
 "The Current State of Things" – 5:43
 "Moss On a Rolling Stone" – 5:43
 "Oh Momma" – 5:35
 "Two for a Show" – 5:14
Tracks 4 and 5 appear on the band's first album, "Brand New World"
Tracks 1, 3, 4, & 6 aired on the local lounge on KCDA, a different version of "Poor Man's Son" was performed live
Track 1 later appeared on Noah Gundersen's debut album Ledges

Personnel
Noah Gundersen – guitar/vocals
Abby Gundersen – violin/vocals
Travis Ehrenstrom - bass guitar
Ivan Gunderson - drums
Michael Porter - electric guitar/vocals
Michael Rabb – organ/piano/keys/vocals
Chris Judd – bass guitar/vocals
Keelan O'Hara – drums

Other albums recorded at The Triple Door
Live at The Triple Door (Skerik's Syncopated Taint Septet) by Skerik's Syncopated Taint Septet (recorded in 2003 and released in 2010)
Live at The Triple Door by Greg Dulli (recorded in 2008)
Live at The Triple Door by Layla Angulo (released in 2005)

References

External links
Triple Door Website

The Courage albums
2008 live albums